Jo Allyn Lowe Park (32 acres) is a public park, with arboretum, located at the corner of Price Road and Locust Road, Bartlesville, Oklahoma, United States. It is open to the public daily.

The park was created in 1980 and named to honor the founder of the Bartlesville Boys Club. It consists of a lake (with fishing pier), tallgrass prairie, and arboretum. The arboretum contains hundreds of species of trees, mostly planted as memorials.

This is an entrance point to Pathfinder Parkway, a bicycle/jogging/walking  path that now extends south into Colonial Housing Addition, but the majority heads north toward Johnstone Park and connects to other parts of the Parkway.

External links
Jo Allyn Lowe Park

See also 
 List of botanical gardens in the United States

Arboreta in Oklahoma
Botanical gardens in Oklahoma
Piers in Oklahoma
Bartlesville, Oklahoma
Protected areas of Washington County, Oklahoma